The Wiley Handbook for Sex Therapy is a 2017 book edited by Zoë D. Peterson in which the authors examine the theory and practice in the psychotherapeutic treatment of sexual problems across different client populations.
The book is a winner of 2018 AASECT Book Award.

Authors

References

External links 
 The Wiley Handbook for Sex Therapy

2017 non-fiction books
English-language books
Non-fiction books about sexuality
Books about orgasm
Wiley (publisher) books
Edited volumes
Sex therapy
Handbooks and manuals